Edmund Wylsford (died 1516) was an English 16th-century Provost of Oriel College, Oxford and a vice-chancellor of the University of Oxford.

Wylsford was a Doctor of Divinity. He was Provost of Oriel College between 30 October 1507 and his death on 3 October 1516. During this period, he was appointed Vice-Chancellor of Oxford University as part of a committee multiple times in 1511, 1512, 1514, and 1515.

See also
 List of provosts of Oriel College, Oxford

References

Bibliography
 

Year of birth unknown
1516 deaths
16th-century English clergy
Provosts of Oriel College, Oxford
Vice-Chancellors of the University of Oxford